Callitriche pulchra, the beautiful water starwort, is a plant that was listed on the 2012 IUCN Red List of Threatened Species, based on specimens gathered on Gavdos island, Crete by H. D. Schotsman.  Additionally, two of Pamapani's specimens were identified at Le Due Palme. Schotsman thereafter classified in 1968 in three different ponds located in Cyrenaica. In 2015 Callitriche pulchra was detected in Cyprus, somewhat reducing its endangered status. Other locations it has been encountered include Greece, Libya and Syria.

References

pulchra
Endangered plants